Oxgangs is a suburb in the south-west of Edinburgh, Scotland. 
Surrounding districts include Caiystane, Dreghorn, Redford, Fairmilehead, Colinton and Swanston and Colinton Mains. The post code area for Oxgangs is EH13.

Etymology
The name derives from "oxgang", an old unit of land measurement. Skene in Celtic Scotland says:
 "in the eastern district [of Scotland] there is a uniform system of land denomination consisting of 'dabhachs', 'ploughgates' and 'oxgangs', each 'dabhach' consisting of four 'ploughgates' and each 'ploughgate' containing eight 'oxgangs'."

History
The building of the area started in around 1953/54; before that (with the exception of Colinton Mains) there had only been a number of prefab houses and several farms but it had been mostly farmland and was basically considered to be part of the countryside. The area consists of large public housing schemes aimed at low to middle income groups, ranging from private bungalows to Edinburgh City Council-owned high rise tower blocks (although these have now been demolished). A significant majority of former council-owned properties in Oxgangs have been bought by tenants under the right to buy scheme leaving approximately 659 properties in council ownership thus making it extremely difficult to be allocated a council home in the area. 
Peter Hoffmann has written memoirs of growing up in Oxgangs between 1958 and 1972 which capture the era and its social and cultural history. He has also written Two Worlds: The Story Of An Edinburgh Doctor, a biography of Dr Motley, a Black American, and the first general practitioner to set up his practice in the area in the mid 1940s until his retirement in 1978.

Amenities

There were two small shopping areas at each end of Oxgangs known locally as the "top" and "bottom" shops. The top shops (Oxgangs Broadway) are larger and feature award winning convenience store called "Premier - Broadway Convenience Store" known as "Dennis'" after the owner of the shop. As of March 2023, the shop has been in the Broadway for 40 years, having been passed down through Dennis' family. He runs it with his wife Linda, who runs the hugely successful Premier Deli, and their daughter Sophie. Other shops in the Broadway include Glo Tanning and Beauty Salon, two barbers and a hairdressers, a bookies, two take aways (a chip shop and a Chinese). There is also a post office and a pharmacy. The bottom shops (Oxgangs Crescent) bottom right of photograph, were demolished along with the high flats, being replaced by housing and a small "Day-Today Express store" in Firrhill Neuk. Located in and around Oxgangs and adjacent areas are a police station, a medical practice, a public library, a nursery, three primary schools and a high school, and a pub.

There are three churches in the area: Church of Scotland, Scottish Episcopal Church and St Mark's Roman Catholic Church, opened by Archbishop Gordon Gray in 1962. Recently a Kingdom Hall was built in the Oxgangs Green area.

Surrounding Oxgangs are three large supermarkets: a Tesco next to Firrhill High School, a Morrisons near the Swanston area and a Scotmid in Colinton Mains. In 2017, Aldi opened a store on the site where the social work building and St John's church previously stood.

AC Oxgangs
AC Oxgangs, a community football team, was founded in 2001. They currently operate 14 teams selected from a total player pool of around 200 youngsters which range in age from 7 to 18 years old. They play their 7-a-side and 11-a-side home games at Colinton Mains Park just beside Oxgangs Road North where a brand new clubhouse has just  been erected. Younger members occasionally play 4-a-side games at the Saughton Sports Complex off Balgreen Road, but also play 7-a-side games at Colinton Mains Park.

Recent changes

In 2003, after years of campaigning by residents the council took the decision to demolish and redevelop Oxgangs high rise flats. In April 2005 longstanding tower block Capelaw Court was demolished to make way for new housing. Capelaw was one of three high rise flats built in Oxgangs Crescent in 1961 and 1962. The other two buildings (Caerketton Court and Allermuir Court) were demolished in November 2006. The demolition of Capelaw Court was filmed and featured on the National Geographic Channel, which interviewed residents of Oxgangs and community leader Heather Levy.

Two neighbouring primary schools situated on Oxgangs Green (Comiston and Hunters Tryst) were recently merged and renamed Pentland Primary. At first the Comiston pupils moved into the building formerly known as Hunters Tryst alongside current Tryst pupils while Comiston was renovated and a year later all staff and children moved permanently into the refurbished Comiston building, now known as Pentland Primary.

Public transport
Public transport is frequent with Lothian Buses operating chartered services. Bus routes 4, 5, 16, 27, airport service 400, and night service N16 all serve the area.

See also
Oxgangs high rise flats
Firrhill

Books
 2020: OXGANGS A Capital Tale Volume 1 
 2020: OXGANGS A Capital Tale Volume 2 
 2019: Paradise Lost - The Edinburgh Oxgangs School Summer Holidays 1958-1972 
 2018: Oxgangs - A Pastime From Time Past: Spirits Across The Air 
 2021: Two Worlds The Story Of An Edinburgh Doctor

References

External links
 Edinburgh Film focus

Areas of Edinburgh
Housing estates in Edinburgh